Cotoneaster × watereri, or Waterer's cotoneaster, is a large evergreen shrub belonging to the genus Cotoneaster.

It is an artificial hybrid, initially of Cotoneaster frigidus, Cotoneaster henrianus and Cotoneaster salicifolius. Later also Cotoneaster rugosus and Cotoneaster sargentii were probably involved.

Description
Cotoneaster × watereri is about 4 m tall, up to 8 m at maturity. Leaves are elliptical, dark green, up to 12 cm long and 3 cm wide. This plant shows large attractive inflorescences with white small flowers and large spherical coral red berries of about 6–9 mm. It is in flower from June to July.

References
 Lingdi L. & Brach A.R. Cotoneaster
 Dickoré W.B. & Kasperek Species of Cotoneaster (Rosaceae, Maloideae) indigenous to, naturalising or commonly cultivated in Central Europe
 Manual of the alien plants of Belgium

watereri
Hybrid plants